Ryan Alebiosu (born 17 December 2001) is an English professional footballer who plays as a right back for Kilmarnock, on loan from Premier League club Arsenal.

Career
Born in London, Alebiosu joined Arsenal in 2010, at the age of 8, turning professional in 2020.

He signed on loan for EFL League One side Crewe Alexandra in January 2022, and made his full professional debut in Crewe's 1–0 league defeat at Gillingham on 1 February 2022. He moved on loan to Kilmarnock in July 2022.

Career statistics

References

2001 births
Living people
English footballers
Arsenal F.C. players
Crewe Alexandra F.C. players
Kilmarnock F.C. players
English Football League players
Association football fullbacks
Black British sportsmen
Footballers from Greater London
Scottish Professional Football League players